Erich Goede (24 May 1916 – 13 May 1949) was a German international footballer.

References

1916 births
1949 deaths
Association football midfielders
German footballers
Germany international footballers